Peter Wagner may refer to:

 Peter Wagner (Manitoba politician) (1916–1995), Canadian politician, member of the Legislative Assembly of Manitoba
 Peter Wagner (social theorist), German social theorist
 Peter J. Wagner (born 1964), American paleontologist and Smithsonian curator
 Peter Joseph Wagner (1795–1884), American politician, U.S. Representative from New York
 C. Peter Wagner (1930–2016), American religious leader, seminary professor
 Peavy Wagner (Peter Wagner, born 1964), German heavy metal musician, lead singer and bass player for the band Rage
 Pete Wagner (born 1955), political cartoonist, activist, author and caricature artist
 Peter Wagner (musicologist) (1865–1931), German musicologist

See also
 Peter Wegner (disambiguation)